Bellavista  (3922 m) is a mountain in the Bernina Range in Switzerland and Italy. The mountain is bounded on the east by the Fuorcla Bellavista and on the west by the Pass dal Zupò. There are four summits on the main ridge, at the heights of 3799, 3888, 3890, and 3922 m from east to west.

The first traverse of all four peaks was made by Emil Burckhardt and Hans Grass on 10 September 1868. C. C. Branch and B. Wainewright with guide Martin Schocher made the first traverse of the Bellavista peaks and the three peaks of the neighbouring Piz Palü on 19 August 1889.

References

External links 
Bernina Range on SummitPost

Bernina Range
Engadin
Mountains of the Alps
Alpine three-thousanders
Mountains of Italy
Mountains of Switzerland
Italy–Switzerland border
International mountains of Europe
Mountains of Graubünden
Three-thousanders of Switzerland
Pontresina